Yuto may refer to:

Yūto, a masculine Japanese given name
Yūtō, Shizuoka, a former town in Hamana District, Shizuoka Prefecture, Japan
Yuto, Jujuy, a city in Jujuy Province, Argentina
Yutō, a wooden container used for serving hot liquids, as in kaiseki cuisine